United Nations Avenue (also known as U.N. Avenue and formerly known as Isaac Peral Street) is a major thoroughfare in Manila, Philippines. A commercial, residential and industrial artery, the avenue runs east–west through the near-center of the city linking Ermita and Rizal Park with the eastern districts. It is home to the World Health Organization Western Pacific headquarters.

U.N. Avenue begins at a fork in Quirino Avenue Extension, Paz Mendoza Guazon Street, and Cristobal Street, just west of Pandacan. It continues through the area of Tanque and Isla de Provisor in northern Paco district passing several rows of warehouses and a few institutional buildings. West of Taft Avenue lies busy Ermita district with a mix of hotels, offices and hospital buildings. Roxas Boulevard lies at its western terminus, with the U.S. Embassy in Manila as the terminating vista.

The avenue is served by the United Nations LRT station.

History
United Nations Avenue was formerly known as Isaac Peral Street, after the Spanish engineer who designed the world's first fully capable military submarine in the late 19th century. Originally a short street in Ermita, it was later extended towards Paco, linking it to what was then called Calle Canonigo, which later became part of the avenue that ended at the present-day Tanque Street. It was previously planned to reach as far as Pandacan at the east; however, it only reached up to its present-day terminus in Paco.

It was later renamed in recognition of the World Health Organization, a United Nations agency, whose building was built in 1959 in the former University of the Philippines property located at its southwest corner with Taft Avenue. The avenue was also the site of the first Hilton Hotel in the Philippines which opened in 1960. This hotel is now Waterfront Manila Hotel and Casino.

Points of interest

 Araullo High School
 Asilo de San Vicente de Paul
 Bayview Hotel
 Emilio Aguinaldo College
 Insurance Commission
 Khalsa Diwan Sikh Temple
 Manila Doctors Hospital
 Manila Police District Headquarters
 Medical Center Manila
 National Bureau of Investigation
 Philam Life Theater (closed in 2013; demolished in 2020)
 Philippine Bible Society
 Philtrust Bank Building
 Pope Pius XII Catholic Center
 PPL Building
 Times Plaza
 UN Square
 Unilever Philippines (old office)
 Waterfront Manila Hotel and Casino (closed since the 2018 fire; renovation planned)
 World Health Organization Western Pacific Regional Office

References

Streets in Manila
Ermita
Paco, Manila